“Chirpynirdi gara deniz” is a song written in 1918 by the Azerbaijani composer Uzeyir Hajibeyov on the lyrics of the poet Ahmed Javad. The song is very popular in Turkey. In Azerbaijan, the song is especially popular in the performance of Azerin, a People's Artist of the Azerbaijan Republic.

Song’s history 
Excited by the participation of the Ottoman Turkey in the First World War, the Azerbaijani poet Ahmed Javad wrote, in December 1914, the poem "The Black Sea raged". In 1918, Uzeyir Hajibeyov wrote the music to the poet's lyrics. However, after 1920, the song was not performed in Azerbaijan. Due to the fact that there were no notes, the song was almost forgotten. Despite this, the song gained popularity in Turkey, being played on radio and television, at official events and banquets. It is even noted that Atatürk himself, upon hearing the song for the first time, shed tears.

In 1990, Suleyman Shenel, a lecturer at the Istanbul Technical University, who was then an intern at the Azerbaijan State Conservatory, reported this song to the Hajibeyov Memorial House-Museum. The song was firstly performed in front of the public in Azerbaijan on 10 March 1993 in the Republic Palace in Baku. The event took place within the jubilee evening dedicated to the 100th anniversary of Ahmed Javad.

Lyrics

See also 
 Daughter of the mountains – Reyhan

References

Compositions by Uzeyir Hajibeyov
Azerbaijani-language songs
1918 songs
Patriotic songs